McHale's Navy is an American sitcom starring Ernest Borgnine that aired from 1962 to 1966.

McHale's Navy may also refer to:

 McHale's Navy (1964 film)
 McHale's Navy (1997 film)

See also
McHale's Navy Joins the Air Force, a 1965 film based on the television series